Mimudea selenographa is a moth in the family Crambidae. It was described by Edward Meyrick in 1936. It is found in the Democratic Republic of the Congo (Katanga Province).

References

Moths described in 1936
Spilomelinae